The Mexica (Nahuatl: , ; singular ) were a Nahuatl-speaking indigenous people of the Valley of Mexico who were the rulers of the Mexica Empire. The Mexica established Tenochtitlan, a settlement on an island in Lake Texcoco, in 1325.  A dissident group in Tenochtitlan separated and founded the settlement of Tlatelolco with its own dynastic lineage.  In 1521, they were conquered by an alliance of Spanish conquistadors and indigenous people including the Tlaxcaltecs led by Hernán Cortés.

Names 
The Mexica are eponymous of the place name Mexico (Mēxihco ), originally referring to the interconnected settlements in the valley that is now Mexico City. The group was also known as the Culhua-Mexica in recognition of its kinship alliance with the neighboring Culhua, descendants of the revered 
Toltecs, who occupied the Toltec capital of Tula from the 10th to 2nd centuries. The Mexica of Tenochtitlan were additionally referred to as the "Tenochca," a term associated with the name of their altepetl (city-state), Tenochtitlan, and Tenochtitlan's founding leader, Tenoch. 

The name Aztec was coined by Alexander von Humboldt, who combined Aztlán ("place of the heron"), their mythic homeland, and tec(atl) "people of". 
The term "Aztec" often today refers exclusively to the Mexica people of Tenochtitlan, Mēxihcah Tenochcah, a tribal designation referring only to the Mexica of Tenochtitlan, excluding those of Tlatelolco or cōlhuah. The term Aztec is often used very broadly to refer not only to the Mexica, but also to the Nahuatl-speaking peoples of the Valley of Mexico and neighboring regions.

History 

After the decline of the Toltecs, about 1200 CE, various Nahua-speaking nomadic peoples entered the Valley of Mexico, possibly all from Aztlan, whose location is unknown. The Mexica were the last group to arrive. There they "encountered the remnants of the Toltec empire (Hicks 2008; Weaver 1972)." According to legend, the Mexica were searching for a sign which one of their main gods, Huitzilopochtli, had given them. They were to find "an eagle with a snake in its beak, perched on a prickly pear cactus," and build their city there.  Eventually, they came to Lake Texcoco, where they finally saw the eagle and cactus on an island on the lake. There, "they took refuge..., naming their settlement Tenochtitlan (Among the Stone-Prickly Pear Cactus Fruit)." Tenochtitlan was founded in 1325, but other researchers and anthropologists believe the year to be 1345. The city was described by conquistador Bernal Díaz del Castillo as a grand, well-ordered metropolis. However, the story of its rise from the muddy lake beds in the Basin of Mexico is one of unrelenting struggle, rivalries, conflict, and suffering.

A dissident group of Mexica separated from the main body and built another city on an island north of Tenochtitlan in 1337. Calling their new home Tlatelolco ("Place of the Spherical Earth Mound"), the Tlatelolca were to become Tenochtitlan's persistent rivals in the Valley of Mexico.  After the rise of the Aztec Triple Alliance, the Tenochca Mexica, the inhabitants of Tenochtitlan, assumed a dominant position over their two allied city-states, Texcoco and Tlacopan. Only a few years after Tenochtitlan was founded, the Mexica dominated the political landscape in Central Mexico until being defeated by the Spanish and their indigenous allies, mainly enemies of the Mexica, in 1519.

Once established in Tenochtitlan, the Mexica built grand temples for different purposes. The Templo Mayor (Main Temple) and nearby buildings are rich in the symbolism of Aztec cosmology that linked rain and fertility, warfare, sacrifice, and imperialism with the sacred mission to preserve the sun and the cosmic order. The Templo Mayor was "the site of large-scale sacrifices of enemy warriors which served intertwined political and religious ends (Berdan 1982: 111–119; Carrasco 1991)." IIt was a double pyramid-temple dedicated to Tlaloc, the ancient Central Mexican rain god, and Huitzilopochtli, the Mexica tribal nomen, who, as the politically-dominant deity in Mexico, was associated with the sun. Over time, the Mexica separated Huitzilopochtli from Tezcatlipoca, another god that was more predominantly idolized, redefining their relative realms of power, reshaping the myths, and making him politically superior.

The Mexica of Tenochtitlan were conquered by the Spanish conquistadors under Hernán Cortés in 1521. The area was expanded upon in the wake of the Spanish conquest of Mexico and administered from the former Aztec capital as New Spain.

Language 
Like many of the peoples around them, the Mexica spoke Nahuatl which, with the expansion of the Aztec Empire, became the lingua franca in other areas. The form of Nahuatl used in the 16th century, when it began to be written in the Latin alphabet introduced by the Spaniards, became known as Classical Nahuatl. Nahuatl is still spoken today by over 1.5 million people, mostly in Mexico.

Notes

References

Sources

 Andrews, James Richard. Introduction to classical Nahuatl. Norman: University of Oklahoma Press, 2003. .
 Barlow, Robert H. (1945). "Some Remarks On The Term "Aztec Empire"". The Americas. 1 (3): 345–349. doi:10.2307/978159. JSTOR 978159.

 Berdan, Frances F. "Mesoamerica: Mexica." In Encyclopedia of Mexico: History, Society & Culture, edited by Michael S. Werner. Routledge, 1998.
 Evans, Susan Toby. "Postclassic Cultures of Mesoamerica." In Encyclopedia of Archaeology, edited by Deborah M. Pearsall. Elsevier Science & Technology, 2008.
 Keber, Eloise Quiñones. "Nahua Rulers, Pre Hispanic." In Encyclopedia of Mexico: History, Society & Culture, edited by Michael S. Werner. Routledge, 1998.
 

 Peregrine, Peter N., and Melvin. Ember, eds. 2002. Encyclopedia of Prehistory: Volume 5: Middle America. 1 online resource (XXIX, 462 pages) vols. Boston, MA: Springer US. 

 Umberger, Emily. "Tezcatlipoca and Huitzilopochtli: Political Dimensions of Aztec Deities." In Tezcatlipoca: Trickster and Supreme Deity, edited by Baquedano Elizabeth, 83–112. University Press of Colorado, 2014.
 Umberger, Emily. "Antiques, Revivals, and References to the past in Aztec Art." RES: Anthropology and Aesthetics, no. 13 (1987): 62–105. 
 Willermet, Cathy, Heather J.H. Edgar, Corey Ragsdale, and B. Scott Aubry. "Biodistances Among Mexica, Maya, Toltec, and Totonac Groups of Central and Coastal Mexico / Las Distancias Biológicas Entre Los Mexicas, Mayas, Toltecas, y Totonacas de México Central y Zona Costera." Chungara: Revista De Antropología Chilena 45, no. 3 (2013): 447–59. 

Aztec
Mesoamerican cultures
Indigenous peoples in Mexico
Extinct ethnic groups

it:Mexica